The Auckland Tuatara is a professional baseball team in the Australian Baseball League based in Auckland, New Zealand. They are the only team from New Zealand to compete in the ABL, and one of two expansion teams that entered the league in the 2018/19 season.

History 
Prior to the team's foundation in 2018, Baseball New Zealand, the country's governing body of the sport of baseball, held talks starting in 2009 regarding the prospects of adding a New Zealand-based team in the Australian Baseball League. In November 2017, the league decided to expand to eight teams beginning in the 2018/19 season, and Baseball New Zealand was officially awarded a spot in the competition.

On 26 August 2018, the club's name was announced as the Auckland Tuatara, named after the oldest surviving species endemic to the country. According to one of the team's board members, Brett O'Riley, the tuatara was chosen as the name in order to celebrate the resilience of the ancient reptiles, and to raise awareness of New Zealand's commitment to species protection. The club's colours, teal and navy blue, are representative of the region's marine heritage. The Tuatara played its home games at McLeod Park in Te Atatū South for the 2018/19 season, and moved to an expanded North Harbour Stadium in Albany for the 2019/20 season and beyond. For baseball a section of seating was permanently removed and replaced by an outfield wall which is termed The Teal monster after the Green Monster wall in Boston.

The club's inaugural manager was announced as former MLB pitcher Steve Mintz.

Three days before the start of the 2019–20 season, Tuatara player Ryan Costello was found dead in his sleep by teammates on 18 November 2019. Players wore 'RC' on their game jersey for the season in his memory.

Due to the COVID-19 pandemic, the team sat out the 2020–21 and 2021–22 Australian Baseball League seasons.

Records

Names in Bold are players still active in the Australian Baseball League

Single season pitching records 
Notable individual records set in one Season, these include all games between 2018-Present

Career pitching records 
Notable individual records set in a Career, these include all games between 2018-Present, To qualify players must return for a second Season

Career hitting records 
Notable individual records set in a Career, these include all games between 2018-Present, To qualify players must return for a second Season

Single season hitting records 
Notable individual records set in one Season, these include all games between 2018-Present

Current roster

References

External links 
 Australian Baseball League website

 
Sport in Auckland
Australian Baseball League teams
Baseball teams established in 2018
2018 establishments in New Zealand